Goulburn High School is a government-funded co-educational comprehensive secondary day school, located in Goulburn, in the Southern Tablelands region of New South Wales, Australia. 

Established in 1883 as Goulburn Boys' High School and as Goulburn Girls' High School, the school enrolled approximately 600 students in 2018, from Year 7 to Year 12, of whom seven percent identified as Indigenous Australians and six percent were from a language background other than English. The school is operated by the NSW Department of Education; the principal is Paul Hogan.

2016 Australian school bomb threats 
On 11 February 2016, Goulburn High School was evacuated and surrounding streets closed after receiving an automated message indicating there was a bomb on premise. Goulburn High School was among a number of Australian schools targeted with hoax bomb threats in early 2016.

See also 

2016 Australian school bomb threats
List of government schools in New South Wales
 Education in Australia

References

External links 
 
 NSW Schools website

Public high schools in New South Wales
Goulburn
1883 establishments in Australia
Educational institutions established in 1883